Pearce is a ghost town in Yazoo County, Mississippi, United States.

Pearce had a post office.  The population in 1906 was about 30.

References

Former populated places in Yazoo County, Mississippi
Ghost towns in Mississippi